Ekerö sommarstad is a locality situated in Ekerö Municipality, Stockholm County, Sweden, with 544 inhabitants in 2010.

References 

Populated places in Ekerö Municipality
Uppland